Bohuslavice may refer to places in the Czech Republic:

Bohuslavice (Jihlava District), a municipality and village in the Vysočina Region
Bohuslavice (Náchod District), a municipality and village in the Hradec Králové Region
Bohuslavice (Opava District), a municipality and village in the Moravian-Silesian Region
Bohuslavice (Prostějov District), a municipality and village in the Olomouc Region
Bohuslavice (Šumperk District), a municipality and village in the Olomouc Region
Bohuslavice, a village and administrative part of Kyjov in the South Moravian Region
Bohuslavice nad Vláří, a municipality and village in the Zlín Region
Bohuslavice u Zlína, a municipality and village in the Zlín Region